"Private Joy" is a song by American musician Prince from his 1981 album Controversy, released as the B-side of the single "Do Me, Baby". The song describes how Prince will never reveal the identity of his secret lover. This is the first time Prince used the LM-1 machine, which he would use throughout his career

In this bouncy disco-pop number, Prince explains that his lover is no one's but his. He sings about what they do together, and the times they share. He claims that he "strangled Valentino", and that she was "his ever since" and that she "belongs to Prince".

The song ends with guitar riffs and feedback from Prince, and segues into "Ronnie, Talk to Russia", the next track on Controversy. These guitar sounds were sampled and used in "Orgasm", a song on Prince's 1994 album Come.

Track listings

"Do Me, Baby" (edit) – 3:57
"Private Joy" – 4:25

La Toya Jackson version

American singer La Toya Jackson covered this song for her 1984 album Heart Don't Lie. Her single had limited release in Japan as a 7" single. Her U.S. hit single "Heart Don't Lie" can be found on the B-side.

According to Jackson, Prince's publishing company, Controversy Music, "approached me about recording songs of his that hadn't gone over too big the first time around. They submitted several songs and I picked 'Private Joy' because it sounded so up-to-date." Though "Private Joy" was Jackson's favorite song from Heart Don't Lie, it was never released as a single outside Japan. Said Jackson at the time, "I loved the song and my record company loved it, but my father manages me and it was his decision to not release that cut."

The Los Angeles Times stated that "note for note, she matches Prince's intensity with her own hard-edged snap, crackle and pop."

Track listings
Japan 7" (#07 SP 815)
"Private Joy" – 4:51
"Heart Don't Lie" (7") – 3:29

Cheyne version
Artist Cheyne recorded a version for the soundtrack of the 1985 film Weird Science.

Track listings
U.S. 12" vinyl (#MCA-23583)
"Private Joy" (extended version) – 5:30
"Private Joy" (instrumental) – 5:44
"Private Joy" (bonus beats plus bass) – 4:28

References

1981 songs
1984 singles
Prince (musician) songs
La Toya Jackson songs
Songs written by Prince (musician)
Song recordings produced by Prince (musician)
CBS Records singles